The Wogamush River (or Wogamus River) is a river in northern Papua New Guinea.

See also
List of rivers of Papua New Guinea
Wogamus languages
Wogamusin language

References

Rivers of Papua New Guinea